N'attendons pas is the third studio album from French singer-songwriter Vianney. It was released on 30 October 2020 by Tôt ou tard. The album includes the singles "N'attendons pas" and "Beau-papa". The album topped the French Albums Chart.

Singles
"N'attendons pas" was released as the lead single from the album on 8 May 2020 and peaked at number 146 on the French Singles Chart, also charting in Belgium. "Beau-papa" was released as the second single from the album on 21 August 2020. It peaked at number 15 on the French Singles Chart and also charted in Belgium.

Track listing

Charts

Weekly charts

Year-end charts

Certifications

Release history

References

2020 albums
Vianney (singer) albums